Lecca (pronounced "Rekka") is a Japanese politician and singer who debuted in 2005.

Discography

Singles 

For You (2009)
My measure (2009)
TSUBOMI feat.  / SNOW CRYSTALS (2010)
Right Direction (2011)

Albums 
 (2005)

Urban Pirates (2006)
 Urban Pirates
 What a girl can do
 If I were your girlfriend
 Luck
 
 
 Dear
 
 Vallya
 Let's begin
 
 

  (2007)

City Caravan (2008)

BIG POPPER (2009)

  (2010)

Step One (2012)

ZOOLANDER (2012)

TOP JUNCTION (2013)

tough Village (2014)

High Street (2017)

Mini-Albums 

Dreamer (2006)
  (2008)
  ~ballads in me~ (2011)

References 

Japanese women singers
Japanese politicians
Living people
Year of birth missing (living people)
Members of the Tokyo Metropolitan Assembly